Toledo Township is a township in Chase County, Kansas, United States.  As of the 2000 census, its population was 302.

Geography
The streams of Bloody Creek, Buckeye Creek, Bull Creek, East Buckeye Creek, Little Bloody Creek, Peyton Creek and Spring Creek run through this township.

Communities
The township contains the following settlements:
 Unincorporated community of Saffordville.
 Unincorporated community of Toledo.

Cemeteries
The township contains the following cemeteries:
 Hillside.

Further reading

References

External links
 Chase County Website
 City-Data.com
 Chase County Maps: Current, Historic, KDOT

Townships in Chase County, Kansas
Townships in Kansas